The 46 ft Watson-class was a non self-righting displacement hull lifeboat built between 1935 and 1946 and operated by the Royal National Lifeboat Institution between 1935 and 1981.

History
The 46 ft Watson was longer and wider than the preceding  type.  The 46 ft type was one of the last to be adapted to suit the conditions at individual stations with shallower draft versions (ONs 805,815,820 and 838) being supplied to four stations. Post World War Two, standard designs were the order of the day.

Description
The 46 ft Watson initially had an aft cockpit with a shelter containing the engine controls. Ahead of the shelter was the exhaust funnel and ahead of the mast was a small forward shelter. On ONs 805 and 815, the cockpit shelter was lengthened, with the funnel mounted on its forward end and these two featured end boxes. ON 820 also had the lengthened shelter but retained a flush deck. From ON 828 the forward shelter was deleted. Two boats, ONs 840 and 846 had midships cockpits, ahead of the funnel, with a shelter ahead of it as well as the rear shelter. Four of the first five boats had two 40 bhp Weyburn CE4 4-cylinder petrol engines, but the fourth, ON 787, was fitted with two 40 bhp Ferry VE4 4-cylinder diesels, making it the first RNLI lifeboat to be built with diesel engines. The diesels became standard from the sixth boat on. In the mid sixties, seven boats were re-engined with 65 bhp Ford-based Parsons Barracuda 6-cylinder diesels after experiments with ON 803 which had been fitted with 47 bhp Parsons Marlin diesels in 1961 and then re-engined with Barracudas in 1963. The 46 ft Watsons were long lived, most reaching more than thirty years service and some topping forty years.

Fleet
ON is the RNLI's sequential Official Number.

External links
RNLI